Marshal Lon Nol (also ; 13 November 1913 – 17 November 1985) was a Cambodian politician and general who served as Prime Minister of Cambodia twice (1966–67; 1969–71), as well as serving repeatedly as defence minister and provincial governor. As a nationalist and conservative, he led the military coup of 1970 against Prince Norodom Sihanouk, abolished the monarchy, and established the short-lived Khmer Republic. Constitutionally a semi-presidential republic, Cambodia was de facto governed under a military dictatorship. He was the commander-in-chief of the Khmer National Armed Forces during the Cambodian Civil War. On April 1st, 1975, 16 days before the Khmer Rouge captured Phnom Penh, Lon Nol fled to the United States, first to Hawaii and Michigan and then to California, where he remained until his death in 1985.

Early life
Nol was born in Prey Veng Province on 13 November 1913, to a family of mixed Khmer-Chinese descent. His father Lon Hin was the son of a Khmer Krom from Tay Ninh Province who later served as a district chief in Siem Reap and Kampong Thom, after making a name for himself 'pacifying' bandit groups in Prey Veng. His maternal grandfather was a Chinese immigrant from Fujian who later became the governor of Prey Veng. Nol was educated in the relatively privileged surroundings of the Lycée Chasseloup-Laubat in Saigon, followed by the Cambodian Royal Military Academy.

Employment in the colonial government
Nol found employment with the French colonial civil service in 1937. He became a magistrate, and soon proved himself as an efficient enforcer of French rule against a series of anti-colonial disturbances in 1939. By 1946, he had risen to the post of Governor of Kratie Province. He became an associate of King Norodom Sihanouk, and by the late 1940s, when he set up a right-wing, monarchist, pro-independence political group, was becoming increasingly involved in the developing Cambodian political scene. Joining the army in 1952, he carried out military operations against the Viet Minh.

After independence, Nol's nationalist Khmer Renovation party (along with small right-wing parties headed by Sam Sary and Dap Chhuon) became the core of the Sangkum, the organisation set up by Sihanouk to participate in the 1955 elections. Sangkum won the elections and Sihanouk became Prime Minister.

In the administration of Sihanouk, 1955–70
Nol was appointed the Army Chief of Staff in 1955, and commander-in-chief of the armed forces in 1960, as well as serving as Defence Minister. At the time, he was a trusted supporter of Sihanouk, his police being instrumental in the suppression of the small, clandestine communist movement in Cambodia. He was appointed deputy Premier in 1963. While Sihanouk, in an attempt to distance his country from the effects of the Vietnam War, was pursuing a foreign policy of "extreme neutrality", which involved association with China and toleration of North Vietnamese activity on the eastern borders, Nol remained friendly towards the United States, and indicated that he regretted the ending of US aid after 1963.

The 1966 parliamentary elections represented a major shift in the balance of power towards Lon Nol and the rightist elements of the Sangkum, as conservative and right-wing candidates were overwhelmingly elected. Lon Nol became Prime Minister, and the following year troops carried out a savage repression of a leftist-inspired revolt, the Samlaut Uprising, in Battambang Province.

Nol was injured in a car crash later in 1967, and temporarily retired from politics. In 1968, however, he returned as Minister of Defence and in 1969 became Prime Minister a second time, appointing the vocally anti-Sihanouk, and pro-US politician Prince Sisowath Sirik Matak as his deputy.

The 1970 coup

Sihanouk later claimed that the 1970 coup against him was the result of an alliance between his longstanding enemy, exiled politician Son Ngoc Thanh and Sirik Matak, with CIA support and planning. Although there are indications that Lon Nol approached the US during 1969 to gauge the likelihood of military support for a coup against Sihanouk, there is no concrete evidence of CIA involvement, though it remains possible some military intelligence agents may have had partial responsibility. It seems likely that in setting in motion the events leading up to the coup, Lon Nol initially intended to strengthen his position against the North Vietnamese with the ultimate aim of preventing their troops (and those of the Viet Cong) from operating within Cambodian borders, and wished to apply pressure on Sihanouk to achieve this. However, events rapidly developed far beyond the original plan, and with the encouragement of Sirik Matak – who wished to see Sihanouk deposed as Head of State – Lon Nol was ultimately to engineer Sihanouk's removal.

While Sihanouk was abroad during March 1970, there were anti-Vietnamese riots in Phnom Penh. On 12 March, Lon Nol and Sirik Matak closed the port of Sihanoukville, through which weapons were being smuggled to the Viet Cong, to the North Vietnamese and issued an ultimatum: all North Vietnamese and Viet Cong forces were to withdraw from Cambodian soil within 72 hours or face military action.

Lon Nol initially refused to countenance Sihanouk being deposed as Head of State; to force his hand, Sirik Matak played him a tape-recorded press conference from Paris, in which Sihanouk blamed them for the unrest and threatened to execute them both on his return to Phnom Penh. However, the Prime Minister remained uncertain as to whether to instigate a vote in the National Assembly. On the night of 17 March, Sirik Matak, accompanied by three army officers, went to the Prime Minister's residence and compelled a weeping Lon Nol to sign the necessary documents at gunpoint.

A vote was taken in the National Assembly on 18 March in which Sihanouk was stripped of his power. General Lon Nol assumed the powers of the Head of State on an emergency basis. On 28 and 29 March there were large-scale popular demonstrations in favour of Sihanouk in several provincial cities, but Lon Nol's forces suppressed them, causing several hundred deaths. The Khmer Republic was formally declared that October, and Sihanouk – who had formed a government-in-exile, the GRUNK, incorporating the Khmer Rouge communists – was condemned to death in absentia. In the meantime during the Cambodian Campaign of April 1970, US and South Vietnamese forces entered Cambodian territory in pursuit of North Vietnamese and Viet Cong troops.

The Khmer Republic and the Civil War

The Khmer Republic (1970–1975) abandoned Sihanouk's neutrality policies, especially with regard to the Vietnamese.  Ultimately, the republic proved disastrous both militarily and politically.  Lon Nol's health started to decline after he suffered a stroke in February 1971. His rule became increasingly erratic and authoritarian: he appointed himself Marshal (a title previously unknown in Cambodia) in April 1971, and in October suspended the National Assembly, stating he would no longer "vainly play the game of democracy and freedom" in wartime. Backed by his forceful, ambitious younger brother General Lon Non, Nol succeeded in reducing the influence of Sirik Matak, In Tam and the other coup leaders. He also insisted on directing many of the Khmer National Armed Forces operations personally.

In time Lon Nol's regime became completely dependent upon large quantities of American aid that towards the end were not backed by the political and military resolve needed to effectively help the beleaguered republic. By 1975, the government was eventually reduced to holding little more than Phnom Penh and the Preah Vihear Temple in the northern border with Thailand. The FANK was quickly running out of ammunition. Lon Nol was increasingly dependent on the advice of soothsayers and Buddhist mystics: at one point during a Khmer Rouge assault on Phnom Penh, he sprinkled a circular line of consecrated sand in order to defend the city. Finally, on 1 April, he resigned and fled the country into exile, as his name was the first on a list of people the Khmer Rouge had vowed to execute.

Exile and death
The first priority of the Khmer Rouge after conquering Cambodia and overthrowing the Khmer Republic was to immediately execute all the deposed leaders and high officials. Lon Nol was able to escape, first to Indonesia and then to the United States. He spent time in Hawaii and Michigan before settling in Fullerton, California, in 1979. He lived with his second wife Sovanna Lon and several of his nine children until his heart condition-related death on 17 November 1985 at St. Jude Medical Center.

Political views
Despite his actions in deposing Sihanouk, Nol was a firm believer in traditional Cambodian hierarchy: after Sihanouk had been removed he prostrated himself at the Queen Mother's feet to ask forgiveness. He termed his ideology, a blend of chauvinist nationalism and mysticism, "Neo-Khmerism".  He expressed an ambition of reuniting the ethnic Khmers of Cambodia with the Khmer Krom of the Mekong Delta and the Khmer Surin of Thailand, projecting a state of "thirty million" Khmers by the year 2020. Asking his followers to embrace the traditions of what he referred to as Mon-Khmer "holy warriors" (yuthesel), he also encouraged them to refer to him as their "Black Papa", a name referring to the dark skin considered to be the sign of an "authentic" Khmer. In late life, Nol referred to himself as a "black Khmer" and sought to deny the fact that he had partial Chinese ancestry.

Family
His younger brother, Lon Nil was killed by pro-Sihanouk workers during Cambodian coup of 1970. Another younger brother, Lon Non worked as Minister of Interior and Ambassador-at-large for the Khmer Republic, and was executed by Khmer Rouge after the Fall of Phnom Penh.  His grandnephew is French kickboxer Antoine Pinto, grandson of his brother Lon Non. 

His son, Lon Rith, established the Khmer Republican Party in 2006.

See also
Lon Nil
Lon Non

Notes

References

Bibliography

1913 births
1985 deaths
20th-century Cambodian politicians
Anti-Vietnamese sentiment
Cambodian politicians of Chinese descent
Cambodian anti-communists
Cambodian Buddhists
Cambodian exiles
Cambodian military personnel
Cambodian nationalists
Cambodian monarchists
Cambodian expatriates in the United States
Sangkum politicians
Defence ministers of Cambodia
Field marshals
Khmer Republic
Leaders who took power by coup
Nol
Mayors of places in Cambodia
People of the First Indochina War
People of the Vietnam War
Prime Ministers of Cambodia
Republicanism in Cambodia
Heads of state of Cambodia
Genocide perpetrators
Burials in California